Enneanectes is a genus of triplefin fish in the family Tripterygiidae.

Species
There are currently 15 recognized species in this genus:
 Enneanectes altivelis Rosenblatt, 1960 (Lofty triplefin)
 Enneanectes atrorus Rosenblatt, 1960 (Blackedge triplefin)
 Enneanectes boehlkei Rosenblatt, 1960 (Roughhead triplefin)
 Enneanectes carminalis D. S. Jordan & C. H. Gilbert, 1882 (Carmine triplefin)
 Enneanectes deloachorum Victor, 2013 
 Enneanectes exsul Rosenblatt, 2013 (Island triplefin) 
 Enneanectes flavus Victor, 2019 
 Enneanectes glendae Rosenblatt, 2013 (Slender triplefin) 
 Enneanectes jordani Evermann & Marsh, 1899 (Mimic triplefin)
 Enneanectes macrops Rosenblatt, 2013 (Mexican triplefin) 
 Enneanectes matador Victor, 2013 
 Enneanectes quadra Victor, 2017 
 Enneanectes reticulatus G. R. Allen & D. R. Robertson, 1991 (Network triplefin)
 Enneanectes smithi Lubbock & A. J. Edwards, 1981
 Enneanectes wilki Victor, 2013

References

 
Tripterygiidae
Taxa named by David Starr Jordan